Aditya is an Indian film producer and actor, primarily appearing in Kannada films. He made his acting debut in 2004, starring in Love and went on to appear in several commercially successful films. He is the son of Kannada director Rajendra Singh Babu.

Career
Aditya's career began at the age of 21, when he began producing many of the films directed by his father. He joined the acting course at Kishore Namith Kapoor Acting School and there he trained to act in films. Soon after this, he started acting in films. Even before his Kannada debut, he acted in the Hindi remake of the popular Kannada movie A. K. 47, with the same title.

His debut in Kannada was with the 2004-released Love, which had an ensemble cast including Mohanlal, Rakshita and Amrish Puri, directed by his father and with music composed by Bollywood composer Anu Malik. The much hyped film failed at the box office. It was the 2005 released Deadly Soma that gained Aditya fame. He played the lead protagonist in the film and earned critical acclaim.

Filmography

References

External links 
 

Indian male film actors
Living people
Male actors in Kannada cinema
Film producers from Bangalore
Male actors from Bangalore
Kannada film producers
Male actors in Tamil cinema
21st-century Indian male actors
1978 births